Rebecca Prichard (born 1971) is English author and playwright,  and one of the major contributors to the In-yer-face theatre movement.

Biography
Prichard studied drama at  Exeter University and in 1994, went on to her playwriting debut in 1994 in the Royal Court Young Writer's festival. In 1998 she was presented with the Critics' Circle Award for Most Promising Playwright. Her play Essex Girls is regarded by playwright Mark Ravenhill as one of the best post-Top Girls all female plays.

Selected works
 Charged
 Futures
 Fair Game
 Yard Gal
 Essex Girls

References

Postmodern theatre
English dramatists and playwrights
1971 births
Living people
Alumni of the University of Essex